The 2018–19 Dhaka Senior Division League was 5th season of the league since the league was rebranded as third tier Dhaka Senior Division League in 2007. A total of 13 teams competed in the league. Kawran Bazar PS won the title, with Dhaka Wanderers Club following in second.

2019 Dhaka Senior Division League Teams
The following 13 clubs will competed in the Dhaka Senior Division League during the season 2019.

Dhaka United SC
Dhaka Wanderers Club
PWD SC
Jatrabari Krira Chakra
Mohakhali XI
Badda Jagoroni Sangsad
Bangladesh Boys Club
Kawran Bazar Progoti Sangha
Koshaituli Samaj Kollyan Sangsad
Nawabpur Krira Sangha
Basabo Tarun Sangha
Sadharan Bima Sangstha
Friends Social Organisation

References

Dhaka League
2018 in Bangladeshi football
2019 in Bangladeshi football